

Gustav Heistermann von Ziehlberg (10 December 1898 – 2 February 1945) was a war criminal and a general in the Wehrmacht during World War II. He was a recipient of the Knight's Cross of the Iron Cross. Convicted in connection with the 20 July plot, he was sentenced to death and executed by firing squad. von Ziehlberg was married to Anneliese von Tschischewitz, with whom he had four daughters and two sons. 

Whilst commanding the 65th Infantry Division in Italy, von Ziehlberg ordered the illegal executions of four SAS men: Captain Patrick Dudgeon, Sergeant William Foster, Corporal James Shortall, and Gunner Bernard Brunt, between September and October 1943. He took 34 Italian civilians hostage and requested permission to execute them in reprisal for suspected partisan attacks. The request was denied by Erwin Rommel. Von Ziehlberg fought on the Eastern Front in 1944.

On 20 July 1944, von Ziehlberg was ordered to arrest his Ia staff officer Major Joachim Kuhn for his involvement in the 20 July plot. Kuhn together with his friend Lieutenant Albrecht von Hagen had arranged for the explosive delivered by Helmuth Stieff to Claus von Stauffenberg. On 21 July he had accompanied General Henning von Tresckow to the front near Królowy Most, where Tresckow committed suicide. Confronted with the warrant, Kuhn denied any entanglement. Instead of arresting him, von Ziehlberg told Kuhn to transfer his official duties and proceed to Berlin in order to clear things up. Kuhn used that opportunity to flee towards the forces of the Soviet 2nd Belorussian Front. He was taken prisoner and interrogated by the SMERSH counter-intelligence agency.

Von Ziehlberg was charged with negligent disobedience. In September 1944, he was sentenced to nine months in prison by the Reichskriegsgericht, but was pardoned for his previous service. He returned to his division, but was again summoned to Berlin on 30 October. Hitler, suspecting him of collaboration with Generaloberst Ludwig Beck, revoked his sentence and had von Ziehlberg re-arrested to face another trial. On 21 November he was sentenced to death by the Reichskriegsgericht, dishonourably discharged, and stripped of all honors, ranks and titles. The judges openly stated that they had to follow the Führer's instructions.

Ziehlberg was executed on 2 February 1945 by a Wehrmacht firing squad at a proving ground near Olympic Stadium in the Charlottenburg (present-day Westend) district of Berlin.

Awards 

 Knight's Cross of the Iron Cross on 27 July 1944 as Generalleutnant and commander of 28. Jäger-Division

Notes

Citations

Bibliography

External links
Gustav Heistermann von Ziehlberg @ Ostdeutsche-Biographie.de

1898 births
1945 deaths
Lieutenant generals of the German Army (Wehrmacht)
People from Inowrocław
People from the Province of Posen
German Army personnel of World War I
German Army generals of World War II
German murderers
German people executed by Nazi Germany
Prussian Army personnel
Recipients of the clasp to the Iron Cross, 1st class
Recipients of the Knight's Cross of the Iron Cross
Executed military leaders
Reichswehr personnel
Executed members of the 20 July plot
People executed by Nazi Germany by firing squad
Nazi war criminals